This is a list of alumni of Adisadel College found on Wikipedia.

Academia  
 

William Emmanuel Abraham, Ghanaian philosopher, Professor Emeritus of Philosophy at the University of California, and the first African to be elected a Fellow of All Souls College 
Ebenezer Laing, Ghanaian botanist
Joshua Owusu-Sekyere, Agricultural Engineer, Rector of Perez University College
John S. Pobee, Theologian, Emeritus Professor of Theology, and Former Dean of the Faculty of Arts, University of Ghana
Kwasi Wiredu, philosopher
Thomas Mensah (engineer), pioneer in fibre optic technology, and lead engineer in first laser guided weapons for US Department of Defense guided missile program

Arts and entertainment  
 

 Kofi Antubam, Ghanaian artist
 Terry Bonchaka, Hip life artist
Ian Jazzi, Actor and musician
M3NSA, Musician 
Koo Nimo -born Kwabena Boa-Amponsem, aka Daniel Amponsah, a Ghanaian folklorist and recording artist
Frank Kobina Parkes, poet
Shatta Rakon Musician
Captain James Hackman Tachie-Menson, First black African ship's captain & first African south of the Sahara to man a ship across the Atlantic Ocean; musician and composer of “Where is Our God?”, “Leonora”, “New Born Prince of Peace” and preferred Ghanaian tune to “Hark, Hark, my Soul”.
George Brigars Williams, former Ghanaian actor.

Business 
 

 Prince Kofi Amoabeng, Businessman and co-founder of defunct UT Bank
Nana Appiah Mensah (aka NAM1), a businessman and Chief Executive Officer of MenzGold Dealership
Sam E. Jonah KBE, Executive Chairman of Jonah Capital; previously President of AngloGold Ashanti
W. Paatii Ofosu-Amaah, Vice President and Corporate Secretary of the World Bank Group, 2003 to 2007. Special Advisor to the President of the African Development Bank, 2008 to 2015.
Ernest Bediako Sampong, Pharmacist and businessman; CEO of Ernest Chemist Limited; Multiple award winner including multiple CEO of the year awards, Ghana’s Order of the Volta Award, and the CIMG Marketing Man of The Year  
Nii Quaynor, Network Computer Systems

Clergy  
 

Robert Okine, former Archbishop of West Africa

Government   
 

Thomas Kwame Aboagye - Politician, Deputy minister in the second republic
Kwadwo Afari-Gyan, Chairman of the Electoral Commission of Ghana from 1993 to 2015.
Kennedy Agyapong - Member of Parliament
Brigadier Akwasi Afrifa, head of state of Ghana and leader of the military government in 1969
Christopher Ameyaw-Akumfi, former Minister for Education in the Kufuor government
John Peter Amewu, Minister for Lands and Natural Resources
Akenten Appiah-Menka - Politician, Deputy minister in the second republic
James Appietu-Ankrah, Member of parliament for the Lower West Akim constituency (2005–2009)
George Aryee, Director General of the Ghana Broadcasting Corporation (1991–1992)
Edward Asafu-Adjaye, diplomat
Frank Bernasko, former minister of state in the NRC and SMC regime, founder and leader of the erstwhile Action Congress Party.
Freddie Blay - lawyer, Former Deputy Speaker of the Parliament of Ghana and Chairman of the New Patriotic Party
 Alex Blankson, Member of parliament for the Akrofuom Constituency (2021–)
 Kojo Botsio, minister of state in the first republic
 Kweku Budu-Acquah, diplomat
 Nana Ato Dadzie, Former Ghanaian Chief of Staff, and a United Nations consultant on peacebuilding and political transitions
 B. J. Da Rocha, first chairman of the New Patriotic Party
 Joseph Ampah Kojo Essel, member of parliament for the Dompim constituency (1965 – 1966)
 Robert K. A. Gardiner, diplomat
 Komla Agbeli Gbedemah, Minister of state in the first republic, founder and leader of the National Alliance of Liberals
 Jacob Hackenburg Griffiths-Randolph, a judge and also the Speaker of the Parliament of Ghana during the Third Republic
Joseph Essilfie Hagan, Minister of state in the first republic of Cape Coast.
F. A. Jantuah, Minister of state in the first republic and in the PNDC regime
Kofi Koranteng, Politician and businessman; Independent Presidential Candidate
Alan John Kyerematen, Ghanaian politician and former diplomat
Joseph Yaw Manu, Politician, Deputy minister in the second republic
Andrew Egyapa Mercer, MP
James Mercer, Former diplomat
Edward Nathaniel Moore, former attorney general of Ghana (SMC regime).
Kwamena Minta Nyarku, Member of parliament for the Cape Coast North constituency (2021–)
Samuel Kobina Casely Osei-Baidoo, Member of parliament for the Komenda-Edina-Eguafo-Abrem during the second republic 
Edward Osei-Kwaku, deputy Minister for Presidential Affairs, and Minister of Youth and Sports
Fritz Kwabena Poku, diplomat
Samuel Ernest Quarm, Diplomat
Kweku George Ricketts-Hagan, Member of Parliament for Cape Coast South, Former Central Regional Minister and Deputy Minister of Finance, and Trade and Industry
Ebenezer Sekyi-Hughes, Speaker of the Parliament of Ghana
Kojo Yankah, former minister of state.

Law  
 

 Chief Justice George Kingsley Acquah,
 Chief Justice Philip Edward Archer
 L.J. Chinery-Hesse, parliamentary draftsman, Solicitor-General and Acting Attorney General (1979)
 Godfred Yeboah Dame, current Attorney General of the Republic of Ghana 
 Edward Nathaniel Moore, former Attorney General of the Republic of Ghana 
 Justice Charles Hayfron-Benjamin, Justice of the Supreme Court of Ghana (1993 – 1999)
Justice Robert John Hayfron-Benjamin, Chief Justice of Botswana (1977 – 1981)
A. K. P. Kludze, Justice of the Supreme Court of Ghana (2003 – 2004)
Koi Larbi, Justice of the Supreme Court of Ghana (1970 – 1972)
Henry K. Prempeh, Justice of the Supreme Court of Ghana (1971 – 1972)
Frederick Poku Sarkodee, one of the three High Court judges that were murdered on June 30, 1982.
Chief Justice Edward Kwame Wiredu

Monarchs  
 

Azzu Mate Kole II, 4th monarch or king, Konor of the Manya Krobo Traditional Area
Opoku Ware II, 15th Emperor-King of the Ashanti people and Ashanti

Public service 
Patrick Kwateng Acheampong, former Inspector General of Police of the Ghana Police Service (IGP).   
Louis Casely-Hayford, Engineer, former Chief Executive Officer of the Volta River Authority
William Frank Kobina Coleman, Engineer, Director General of the Ghana Broadcasting Corporation (1960–1970)
E. R. T. Madjitey, first Ghanaian commissioner of police and a former politician

Science and technology  
 

Ave Kludze, a Rocket Scientist, Senior NASA Engineer and first African to fly (command and control) a spacecraft in orbit including the ERBS and TRMM spacecraft for NASA.
Thomas Mensah - scientist whose single-handed work was most important in making fibreoptic technology commercial.

Sports 
 

Samuel Appiah, footballer
Ibrahim Ayew, footballer
Baffour Gyan, retired footballer

References

Lists of Ghanaian people by school affiliation